The Criterion Theatre was a theatre in Sydney, Australia which was built in 1886 by architect George R Johnson on the south east corner of Pitt and Park streets. It closed in 1935 and the building was demolished.

History 
The Criterion Theatre often referred to as the 'Cri' opened on 27 December 1886. Situated on the south east corner of Pitt and Park streets, Sydney, it was funded by John Solomon and designed by architect George R Johnson. The 'Cri', was Sydney's most famous intimate playhouse at the time with a Neo-Renaissance exterior and a capacity of approximately 991 seats. The 'Cri' was used for drama and music performances for almost 50 years. It closed in 1935, partially as a result of the Depression and competition from the growth of cinemas and was demolished in 1935, to facilitate the widening of Park Street. The Criterion Hotel was built on the narrow strip of land remaining, a legacy of one of Sydney's earliest theatres.

Design and Construction 
The Criterion Theatre was built in the baroque (Italianate) style or the Neo-Renaissance style. It was conjoined with the Criterion Family Hotel. The internal design was Georgian colonial with a seating capacity of between 990-1000. The auditorium colour scheme was light blue and gold. Seats were covered in ruby plush velvet and balconies incorporated gilt and brocade. This was a distinct change from the conventions of theatre colour schemes at the time which tended to favour green baize. A portrait of James Cook proclaiming the east coast of Australia in the name of Britain descended between acts.

Although seen as an improvement on theatre design for Sydney, a report by the colonial architect was critical of inadequate and malodorous backstage facilities, in particular the orchestra pit and dressing rooms. This triggered a refurbishment in 1892. Interiors were remodelled along Moorish inspired colours of pale blue, fawn and gold. Cook's portrait was replaced by a Moorish Palace. A further refurbishment in 1905 addressed health and safety issues of backstage facilities as well as fireproofing, increased number of exits and additional seating capacity.

Productions 
The Criterion Theatre opened with the operetta Falka performed by the Rignold and Allison Opera Company. Other notable productions included The Sultan of Mocha (1890), The Kelly Gang (1898) and The Squatter's Daughter (1907). It hosted a number of production companies including Brough Bouicault Comedy Company (producing works by Pinero and Wilde), Henry Bracy's Comic Opera Company, Pollards Lilliputian Opera Company and the Curtis Minstrels. Expatriates Oscar Ashe and Lily Brayton also toured production at the Cri. The final production at the Cri was Barry Connor's The Patsy.

In 1915, J. C. Williamson's leased the Cri from new owner Frank Musgrove. Williamson's imported London West End shows until the Cri closed in 1935. Prior to closure and demolition the north east corner of Pitt and park streets (adjacent to the Cri) became a popular meeting place for unemployed actors and was known as Poverty Point. The Criterion Family Hotel survived the demolition and became a popular watering hole for actors engaged in radio plays at the nearby Australian Broadcasting Commission (ABC).

References

1886 establishments in Australia
Demolished buildings and structures in Sydney
Former theatres in Sydney
Demolished theatres
Buildings and structures demolished in 1935